The Saturday Magazine was a British magazine published from 7 July 1832 to 28 December 1844 by the Committee of General Literature and Education, who were in turn sponsored by the Society for Promoting Christian Knowledge. It ran for 801 issues, with the latter issues being published by John William Parker in London. The Saturday Magazine was established as an Anglican rival to the Penny Magazine as a way for the working man to educate himself.  The 4-page issues were sold for 1 penny per weekly issue, or sixpence for monthly parts. A typical edition of the Saturday Magazine began with an account of some exotic place. At this time the expansion of the British empire was speeding up and people at home in England were very interested in finding out what was happening around the world. Other articles would be about nature, science, history, technology, etc.

References

External links
 
The Saturday Magazine at Google books 
 Hathi Trust. Saturday Magazine digitized issues

1832 establishments in the United Kingdom
1844 disestablishments in the United Kingdom
News magazines published in the United Kingdom
Christian magazines
Defunct magazines published in the United Kingdom
Magazines published in London
Magazines established in 1832
Magazines disestablished in 1844
Weekly magazines published in the United Kingdom
Religious magazines published in the United Kingdom